Daria Kasatkina defeated Daria Saville in the final, 6–4, 6–4 to win the singles tennis title at the 2022 Championnats de Granby.

Lizette Cabrera was the reigning champion from 2019, when the tournament was an ITF tournament, but chose to play in the US Open qualifying event instead.

Seeds

Draw

Finals

Top half

Bottom half

Qualifying

Seeds

Qualifiers

Lucky loser

Qualifying draw

First qualifier

Second qualifier

Third qualifier

Fourth qualifier

References

External links
Main draw
Qualifying draw

Championnats Banque Nationale de Granby - Singles